Paul Ronald Friedberg (born December 14, 1959) is an American former fencer.

Early and personal life
Friedberg was born in Baltimore, Maryland, and is Jewish. His brother is Olympic fencer John Friedberg.

Fencing career
Fencing at the University of Pennsylvania for the University of Pennsylvania Quakers, Friedberg was four-time All-Ivy League, and a three-time All-American. He won the NCAA saber titles in 1979, 1980, and 1981. As a senior in 1981, Friedberg received the Class of 1915 Award, given to a senior class athlete who most closely approaches the ideal University of Pennsylvania student-athlete. He graduated with degrees from the University of Pennsylvania School of Engineering and Applied Science, and later earned an MBA from Penn's Wharton School of Business.

Friedberg won a gold medal at the 1981 Maccabiah Games. He competed at the 1983 Pan American Games, won silver medals in team saber at the 1987 Pan American Games and the 1991 Pan American Games, and won a gold medal in team saber at the 1995 Pan American Games.

He competed in the team sabre event at the 1988 Summer Olympics in Seoul. Friedberg was inducted into the Penn Athletic Hall of Fame in 1996.

Miscellaneous
Friedberg appeared on season 29 of This Old House, renovating his house in Newton, Massachusetts.

References

External links
 

1959 births
Living people
Jewish male sabre fencers
Jewish American sportspeople
American male sabre fencers
Olympic fencers of the United States
Fencers at the 1988 Summer Olympics
Sportspeople from Baltimore
Sportspeople from Newton, Massachusetts
Maccabiah Games medalists in fencing
Maccabiah Games gold medalists for the United States
Competitors at the 1981 Maccabiah Games
Fencers at the 1983 Pan American Games
Fencers at the 1987 Pan American Games
Fencers at the 1991 Pan American Games
Fencers at the 1995 Pan American Games
Pan American Games medalists in fencing
Pan American Games gold medalists for the United States
Pan American Games silver medalists for the United States
University of Pennsylvania School of Engineering and Applied Science alumni
Wharton School of the University of Pennsylvania alumni
21st-century American Jews
Medalists at the 1987 Pan American Games
Medalists at the 1991 Pan American Games
Medalists at the 1995 Pan American Games